Rainbow International School is an international school for infant, junior and secondary education in the Kampala district of Uganda.

The Rainbow International School was established in September 1991 as a primary school with 29 children. In September 1995, the school moved to its present  site with newly constructed purpose-built classrooms and administration block and playing fields. The school is in the Kampala district. It is owned by the Midland Group of companies.

The Rainbow School has been helped and fund-raised for by the Run4Unity association and the Focolaré.

Events

International Talent Show
This talent show was created by Rainbow, in which students from nearby international schools take part. There are three categories: vocal, instrumental and dance, and usually takes place in or around March of the current academic year. (Green hill Academy is not an international School.)
Aga Khan International School Uganda
debut 2015; winner 2017
British School Kampala
debut 2017
Greenhill Academy
debut 2014, exited 2015 
Galaxy International School Uganda
debut 2014, exited 2017
GEMS International School Uganda
debut 2017
Kampala International School of Uganda
debut 2012; winner 2012, 2013, 2014, 2015
International School of Uganda
debut 2012, exited 2013, returned 2017
Heritage International School Uganda
debut 2012, exited 2014
Kabojja International School Uganda
debut 2012, exited 2017

Internal Talent Show 
The internal talent show was founded by former Head Girl Inge Baredse and has taken place every year since to determine the participants in the international talent show. This Talent Show, comparing to the International Talent Show, also includes drama and comedy & takes place in the first term of the current academic year.

Charities 
In Rainbow there are four major Charities: Arms Around Africa, CARE, "Interact" founded by Jewel Matoya(Run by Vansh Bataviya and Ernest Mathieu Mwidu) and "Habitat For Humanity". Nevertheless, there are two other charities: 3C founded by Sharon Kahumbu and Noella Byenkya, and "Lost And Found" founded by Lynn Muhairwe and Cinthya Peng which are not running amidst COVID-19.

Scholarship 
Since 2014, Rainbow awards scholarship for students that are active in school life in school education and outdoor activities. 
2014: Julian Lucawiecki, Emma Barry, Gloria Azairwe, Simran Alibhai 
2016: Michael Kulik, Prathik Poojary, Gloria Mrindoko di Monica, Suraj Raj.

Duke of Edinburgh Award 
Rainbow commenced its participation in the Duke of Edinburgh award in September 2014, which was founded by Mr. Skulmosky. The current Duke of Edinburgh Award leader is Mr. Morton. The award was discontinued at Rainbow temporarily, but reinstated on 27 August 2017.

References

External links
 Official website

Boarding schools in Uganda
Schools in Kampala
Educational institutions established in 1991
1991 establishments in Uganda